The Centralian Superbasin is a large intracratonic sedimentary basin which occupied a large area of central, southern and western Australia during much of the Neoproterozoic Era (~830–540 Ma).

This superbasin was disrupted by two periods of uplift and mountain building, the latest Neoproterozoic Petermann Orogeny and Palaeozoic Alice Springs Orogeny, to leave remnants including the Amadeus, Georgina, Ngalia, and Officer basins.

See also
Natural history of Australia

References

Basins
Geology of Western Australia
Geology of the Northern Territory
Geology of South Australia
Proterozoic
Sedimentary basins of Australia